Andrew Edward Bertie Matthews (died 1995), was one of the St Mary's medical students who volunteered to assist at Bergen-Belsen concentration camp in 1945.

References 

20th-century British medical doctors
London medical students who assisted at Belsen
1945 in medicine
1995 deaths